Vijay Amritraj (born 14 December 1953) is an Indian sports commentator, actor and retired professional tennis player from Madras. He was awarded the Padma Shri, India's 4th highest civilian honour, in 1983. In 2022, he was honored for his contributions to tennis in London by the International Tennis Hall of Fame and International Tennis Federation.

Early life
Vijay was born in Madras, India to Maggie Dhairyam and Robert Amritraj. He has two brothers, Anand Amritraj and Ashok Amritraj, who were also international tennis players.

Career
After playing his first Grand Prix event in 1970, Amritraj achieved his first success in singles in 1973 when he reached the quarterfinals at two Grand Slam events. At Wimbledon, he lost in five sets to the eventual champion Jan Kodeš and later that summer at the US Open, lost to Ken Rosewall after having beaten Rod Laver two rounds earlier.

Amritraj beat Björn Borg in the second round in the US Open in 1974 before losing to Rosewall in quarterfinals. In 1979, he lost in the second round of Wimbledon to defending champion Borg after being up two sets to one and leading 4–1 in the fourth set. He reached his career-high ranking in singles of world No. 16 in July 1980. In 1981, he reached the quarterfinals of Wimbledon before losing in five sets to Jimmy Connors after being up 2–0. He beat John McEnroe in the first round of Cincinnati Masters in 1984. Overall, he had five career wins over Jimmy Connors in their eleven matches.

Amritraj was part of the India Davis Cup team that reached the finals in 1974 and 1987. Amritraj had a career singles win–loss record 384–296, winning 16 singles and 13 doubles titles.

Acting career
Amritraj has also pursued an acting career. His best known role is probably as the MI6 intelligence operative Vijay in the 1983 James Bond film Octopussy. He also appeared briefly in Star Trek IV: The Voyage Home (1986) as an unnamed starship captain.

He was also a regular character in the NBC TV series The Last Precinct and the Yakov Smirnoff comedy What a Country, as well as a guest star on various television shows such as Hart to Hart. He has since gone on to become a sports commentator, has been a judge at the Miss Universe pageant and has developed a multimedia business. Amritraj also hosts a talk show named Dimensions with Vijay Amritraj broadcast on CNN-IBN.

Personal life
Amritraj lives in Southern California with his wife Shymala, and sons Prakash Amritraj and Vikram.

His son Prakash and nephew Stephen Amritraj are also professional tennis players.

On 9 February 2001, Vijay was appointed a United Nations ambassador for peace. He has been raising awareness on the issues of drugs and HIV/AIDS and has raised funds to fight the spread of AIDS worldwide. Vijay Amritraj founded The Vijay Amritraj Foundation in 2006.

Filmography

Career Statistics

Singles performance timeline

Career finals

Singles: 25 (18–7)

Doubles: 29 (14–15)

References

External links
 
 
 
 

1953 births
Living people
Indian emigrants to the United States
Indian male film actors
Indian male tennis players
Indian sports broadcasters
Olympic tennis players of India
Racket sportspeople from Chennai
Recipients of the Arjuna Award
Recipients of the Padma Shri in sports
Tamil sportspeople
Tennis players at the 1988 Summer Olympics
Don Bosco schools alumni
University of Madras alumni
American people of Indian Tamil descent
American sportspeople of Indian descent
Indian-American tennis players
Amritraj family